Emma Linda Palmer Littlejohn (1883–1949) was an Australian feminist, journalist and radio commentator.

Early life and education
Emma Linda Palmer was born on 11 December 1883 at Double Bay, Sydney. Her parents were Richard Teece and Helena, née Palmer. Her four brothers included barrister Richard Clive Teece and she had two sisters. Palmer was educated at Ascham School, and was involved in philanthropic work as part of the Ascham Old Girls' Union.

Career
A feminist, Littlejohn launched the League of Women Voters in 1928 to support female candidates for public office and to press for feminist reforms. 
Littlejohn was Australian delegate to the congress of the International Alliance of Women for Suffrage and Equal Citizenship in Istanbul in 1935.
Littlejohn addressed the Assembly of the League of Nations on behalf of the Equal Rights International (Geneva). Littlejohn was also a proponent of eugenics.

Littlejohn was a member of the Sydney Day Nursery Association’s governing committee. She belonged to the New South Wales Institute of Journalists (1933–41) and the Business and Professional Women's club of Sydney.

Littlejohn broadcast for the British Broadcasting Corporation and for 2UW and 2UE radio stations in Sydney. Littlejohn also wrote for the Australian Women's Weekly magazine.

Tilden Place in the Canberra suburb of Cook is named in her honour.

Works
 Life and Lucille (1933)

Personal life
She married Albert Littlejohn on 5 April 1907 at St John's Church of England, Darlinghurst. They had four children. In 1941 she divorced Albert Littlejohn. She married Charles Joseph Tilden at Charleston, South Carolina, on 6 April 1942 and settled in New Jersey; they returned to Sydney in 1944.

Littlejohn died of cancer in the Scottish Hospital, Paddington, on 21 March 1949.

References

Australian feminist writers
Australian women activists
Anti-poverty advocates
19th-century Australian women
20th-century Australian women
1883 births
1949 deaths
People educated at Ascham School